Sergey Vadimovich Bocharnikov (born 28 February 1988 in Kharkov) is a Belarusian biathlete who competes internationally.
 
He participated in the 2018 Winter Olympics.

Biathlon results
All results are sourced from the International Biathlon Union.

World Championships
0 medals

*During Olympic seasons competitions are only held for those events not included in the Olympic program.
**The single mixed relay was added as an event in 2019.

References

External links

1988 births
Living people
Belarusian male biathletes
Olympic biathletes of Belarus 
Biathletes at the 2018 Winter Olympics
Sportspeople from Kharkiv